The Grand Bay Savanna Addition Tract is an addition to The Grand Bay Savanna State Nature Preserve located in Mobile County. This addition consists of 662 acres, which were acquired with financial support from the U.S. Fish and Wildlife Service, through the National Coastal Wetlands Program.

This tract serves as an addition to the property acquired in 1996, all of which is being managed primarily for the preservation and restoration of species and communities endemic to or dependent upon the Coastal Lowlands of Alabama. This tract as well as the previously purchased Grand Bay Savanna Tract will complement the existing Grand Bay National Wildlife Refuge.

Protected areas of Mobile County, Alabama
Nature reserves in Alabama